Arvid David Hummel (30 April 1778, Göteborg – 20 October 1836, Ekenäs) was a Swedish entomologist.

Hummel was a notary. He wrote Essais entomologiques. St. Pétersbourg: de l'Imprimerie de la Chancellerie privée du Ministère de l'Intérieur, 1821–29.

References
Tommila, P. 1963 [Hummel, A. D.]  Ann. Ent. Fennici 29, 152–170.

Swedish entomologists
1778 births
1836 deaths